Mount Pleasant is a city in Maury County, Tennessee, United States. Mount Pleasant was the birthplace of 19th-century writer and humorist Samuel R. Watkins and formerly titled "The Phosphate Capital of the World." The population was 4,561 at the 2010 census,  and 4,784 in 2020.

History
Settlement of Mount Pleasant began in the early 19th century, and increased following the construction of the Military Road connecting Nashville and Madisonville, Louisiana, in 1817.  By the time Mount Pleasant incorporated as  a city in 1824, it was home to a store, tavern, and several churches.

In 1895, brown phosphate rock was discovered in Mount Pleasant, leading to a mining boom, and giving the city its nickname. Within a few years, ten phosphate mining companies were operating in Mount Pleasant, producing over 25,000 tons per year.  The city's population grew from 466 in 1890 to 2,007 in 1900.  Phosphate mining remained a major part of the city's economy into the latter half of the 20th century.

Geography
Mount Pleasant is located at  (35.544977, -87.198683). Mount Pleasant is situated in a relatively broad plain surrounded by low hills to the east, south, and west. U.S. Route 43 connects the city with Columbia to the northeast and Lawrenceburg to the south.

Climate

Demographics

2020 census

As of the 2020 United States census, there were 4,784 people, 1,935 households, and 1,318 families residing in the city.

2000 census
As of the census of 2000, there were 4,491 people, 1,815 households, and 1,232 families residing in the city. The population density was 406.5 people per square mile (156.9/km2). There were 2,008 housing units at an average density of 181.8 per square mile (70.2/km2). The racial makeup of the city was 75.02% White, 23.45% African American, 0.33% Native American, 0.11% Asian, 0.02% Pacific Islander, 0.24% from other races, and 0.82% from two or more races. Hispanic or Latino of any race were 0.87% of the population.

There were 1,815 households, out of which 33.3% had children under the age of 18 living with them, 44.6% were married couples living together, 19.2% had a female householder with no husband present, and 32.1% were non-families. 28.7% of all households were made up of individuals, and 13.7% had someone living alone who was 65 years of age or older. The average household size was 2.43 and the average family size was 2.97.

In the city, the population was spread out, with 26.4% under the age of 18, 8.0% from 18 to 24, 28.2% from 25 to 44, 22.0% from 45 to 64, and 15.4% who were 65 years of age or older. The median age was 37 years. For every 100 females, there were 82.8 males. For every 100 females age 18 and over, there were 75.2 males.

The median income for a household in the city was $32,004, and the median income for a family was $36,949. Males had a median income of $31,285 versus $22,599 for females. The per capita income for the city was $16,345. About 14.9% of families and 18.5% of the population were below the poverty line, including 27.6% of those under age 18 and 14.1% of those age 65 or over.

Government

The City of Mount Pleasant government consists of five elected commissioners, elected every four years. After each election, at the next scheduled commission meeting, the five commissioners vote on which commissioners will server as mayor and vice mayor. In case of tie or disagreement, the commission will continue nominating and voting until a majority vote is achieved for each position.

Current Mount Pleasant, Tennessee Commissioners
 Bill White (Mayor)
 Jacqueline Grandberry (Vice Mayor)
 Willie Alderson
 Mike Davis
 Eric Harvey

The City Manager is selected, by the commission, and is hired on a variable year contract. The city managers is responsible for day to day operations of the city. Additionally, the city manager is the supervisor of all other city departments heads and staff.

Police Department
The Mount Pleasant Police Department was established in 1824.

 2014–Present — Michael Hay

Fire Department
The Mount Pleasant Fire Department is a career fire department consisting of full-time and part time firefighters. The fire department was established in 1899.

 1988—2001 - M. H. "Cotton" Massey
 2001—2017 - Tim Smith
 2017—Present - Phillip Grooms

Transportation
Mount Pleasant is located on U.S. Route 43, as well as State Routes 243 and 166.

Mount Pleasant is also home to the Maury County Regional Airport.

Public transportation is provided by the Mule Town Trolley Service. The Mule Town Trolley connects people all across Maury County. The routes extend from Mount Pleasant to Columbia and on to Spring Hill.  The fare is $1.00 each way and riders can request a stop anywhere along the trolley route. The trolley service is managed by the South Central Tennessee Development District.

See also

 List of cities in Tennessee

References

External links

 
 Municipal Technical Advisory Service entry for Mount Pleasant — information on local government, elections, and link to charter

Cities in Tennessee
Cities in Maury County, Tennessee
Cities in Nashville metropolitan area